The following is a list of Canadian podcasts.

List

References 

Canadian

podcasts